Ill Niño (stylized as ill niño) is an American metal band formed in Union City, New Jersey, in 1998 by drummer and percussionist Dave Chavarri, who is the sole original member of the band. They have released seven studio albums, two EPs and one compilation album, totaling in over 1.3 million worldwide album sales.

History
Ill Niño was formed as El Niño by former Pro-Pain drummer David "Dave" Chavarri in May 1998. He enlisted Merauder vocalist Jorge Rosado, guitarist Daniel Gomez and bassist Christian Machado and took on the position of drummer and percussionist himself. With this line-up, the band released a self-titled EP. Gomez left the band soon after the EP's release, with a variety of guitarists filling in his spot. Among them were future fulltime member Marc Rizzo, Scott Roberts of Biohazard and Derek Sykes of Demolition Hammer. Sykes also appears on the compilation album Métalo, released by Grita! Records in June 1999. By this time, the band had already renamed to Ill Niño. However, just a month later, the band was put on hold due to Chavarri taking over Roy Mayorga's duties in Soulfly on the Bring Da Shit Tour. After two months on tour, Chavarri decided to reform his old band, now with Machado on lead vocals and joined by guitarists Marc Rizzo and Jardel Paisante, bassist Lazaro Pina and Roger Vasquez on additional percussions. In this formation, the band's first release was a self-titled EP in 2000. They received exposure via the New Jersey metal college radio station WSOU and opened for bands like Kittie, Soulfly and Snapcase. Subsequently, the band was signed by Roadrunner Records.

On September 18, 2001, Ill Niño released their debut album, Revolution Revolución. The album peaked at No. 28 in the Billboard 200 and went on to sell over 350,000 albums worldwide in the first two years after release. In early 2003, just before Ill Niño was set to record the follow-up, the band parted ways with guitarist Marc Rizzo and percussionist Roger Vasquez. Confession was recorded in mid-2003 and released on September 30, 2003. It debuted at No. 37 in the Billboard 200 with first week sales of 27,863. The lead single, "How Can I Live", was their first single to break into the Billboard charts, peaking at No. 26 on the Mainstream Rock chart.

The band's third effort, One Nation Underground, was released on September 27, 2005 and debuted at No. 101 on the Billboard 200 charts. On July 15, 2006, Ill Niño parted with Roadrunner Records and their guitarist Jardel Paisante. Just a week later, they signed a new deal with the recently formed Cement Shoes Records. Roadrunner released The Best of Ill Niño on September 12, 2006, as a contractual obligation to the label, and without the band's consent or involvement.

Through Cement Shoes Records they released The Under Cover Sessions, an EP featuring three covers and two new songs, and Enigma, their fourth studio album, released in 2008 after multiple delays. The album sold 5,000 copies in the United States in its first week of release and debuted at No. 145 on the Billboard 200 chart.

In March 2010, Ill Niño signed with Victory Records. Dead New World, the band's label debut, was released on October 25, 2010 and production was shared by Sahaj Ticotin and Clint Lowery of Sevendust. Epidemia, the band's sixth album, was released on October 22, 2012. This was their last release to feature long-time percussionist Daniel "Danny" Couto, who left the band in late 2013 and was replaced by Oscar Santiago. The band's seventh studio album, Till Death La Familia, was released on July 22, 2014. Afterwards, they toured in support of the new album and embarked on a worldwide "15 Years Of Revolution" tour to celebrate the 15th anniversary of Revolution Revolución in 2016 and 2017.

On January 15, 2019, Dave Chavarri announced that Cristian Machado, Ahrue Luster and Diego Verduzco had departed the band. They were replaced by Marcos Leal (Shattered Sun), Jes De Hoyos  (Sons of Texas) and Salvadore Dominguez (ex-Upon a Burning Body), respectively. This occasion also saw the return of Daniel "Danny" Couto on percussions. One day later, the three former members dismissed Chavarri's public statement and assured the band's fans that they had not departed the band, vowing to continue as "Ill Niño" instead.

On March 21, 2019, MetalSucks acquired a copy of the lawsuit paperwork filed by Machado, Luster and Verduzco accusing Chavarri of shady business deals, such as using his status as Ill Niño's manager to scam the band into taking a financial loss while repaying a personal loan, falsifying financial documents in order to keep tens of thousands of dollars for himself, pocketing show guarantees and tour advances for himself, sometimes even canceling tours and then refusing to return the promoter's advance, and refusing the band members their legally owed access to financial records among many other accusations.

In March 2020, Chavarri, Pina, Machado, Luster and Verduzco reached a mutual agreement, allowing Chavarri and Pina to continue with the Ill Niño bandname. With the legal issues resolved, ex-Ill Niño members Machado, Luster and Verduzco went on to form a new band Lions at the Gate, and the new Ill Niño line-up began work on their eighth album and subsequently released a second single, "Máscara", featuring AJ Channer from Fire from the Gods. At the same time, they announced the title of their next album, IllMortals. They also held a one-day event dubbed "American Revolución" on January 30, 2021, along with Fire From the Gods and Hyro the Hero. Also present as guests were former members of the band, such as Marc Rizzo, Jorge Rosado and Daniel Gomez. This marked the first time in over 18 years they performed with Ill Niño. On October 6, 2021, Rizzo revealed that he had rejoined Ill Niño as their permanent lead guitarist.

In an interview during the band's spring 2022 tour, Dave Chavarri announced May 6 as the release date for the new album IllMortals. On that day, Ill Nino instead released a new single titled "This Is Over" and later announced June 10 as the album's new release date. However, the album was again delayed for undisclosed reasons and remains unreleased.

Musical style 
Ill Niño are described as Latin metal, nu metal, alternative metal and metalcore.

Band members

Current
 Dave Chavarri – drums (1998–present), percussion (1998–1999, 2003)
 Marc Rizzo – lead guitar (1998, 1999–2003, 2021–present)
 Lazaro Pina – bass (1999–present)
 Daniel Couto – percussion (2003–2013, 2019–present)
 Marcos Leal – vocals (2019–present)
 Salvadore Dominguez – rhythm guitar (2019–present)
 Miggy Sanchez – percussion, backing vocals (2022–present)

Studio and touring musicians
 Scott Roberts – rhythm guitar (1998)
 Omar Clavijo – turntables, samples, keyboards, percussion (2001–2006)

Former
 Daniel Gomez – guitars (1998)
 Jorge Rosado – vocals (1998–1999)
 Derek Sykes – guitars (1999)
 Roger Vasquez – percussion (1999–2003)
 Jardel Martins Paisante – rhythm guitar (1999–2006)
 Cristian Machado – vocals (1999–2019), bass (1998–1999)
 Ahrue Luster – lead guitar (2003–2019)
 Diego Verduzco – rhythm guitar (2006–2019)
 Oscar Santiago – percussion (2013–2019)
 Jes De Hoyos – lead guitar (2019–2021)

Timeline

Discography

 Revolution Revolución (2001) 
 Confession (2003) 
 One Nation Underground (2005) 
 Enigma (2008) 
 Dead New World (2010) 
 Epidemia (2012)
 Till Death, La Familia (2014)
 IllMortals (TBA)

References

External links 
 

1998 establishments in New Jersey
American alternative metal musical groups
American nu metal musical groups
 
Musical groups established in 1998
Musical groups from New Jersey
Heavy metal musical groups from New Jersey
Roadrunner Records artists